Olipa is a given name and surname. Notable people with the name include: 

Olipa Chimangeni, Malawian politician
Olipa Myaba Chiluba, Malawian politician
Rogers Olipa (born 2001), Ugandan cricketer

African given names